Damien Doligez is a French academic and programmer. He is best known for his role as a developer of the OCaml system, especially its garbage collector. He is a research scientist (chargé de recherche) at the French government research institution INRIA.

Activities

In 1990, Doligez and Xavier Leroy built an implementation of Caml (called Caml Light) based on a bytecode interpreter with a fast, sequential garbage collector, and began to extend it with support for concurrency. In 1996, Doligez was part of the team that built the first version of OCaml, and has been a core maintainer of the language since then.

In 1994, Hal Finney issued a challenge on the cypherpunk mailing to read an encrypted SSLv2 session. Doligez used spare computers at Inria, ENS and École polytechnique to break it after scanning half the key space in 8 days. He came in a close second in the competition, with the winning team announcing their result just two hours earlier.

In 2008, Doligez worked with Leslie Lamport and others to build the TLA+ proof manager which supports the incremental development and checking of hierarchically structured computer-assisted proofs. The proof manager project remains actively maintained and developed as of 2022.

References

External links
Damien Doligez's home page

Computer programmers
French computer scientists
Living people
Year of birth missing (living people)
Place of birth missing (living people)